Rongøyna or Rongøy is an island in Øygarden municipality in northwestern Vestland county, Norway. The  island is located in the Øygarden archipelago, north of the island of Toftøyna, east of Ono, and south of Blomøyna.  The village of Rong covers the majority of the island.  The island is connected to the island of Toftøyna via the Rongesundet Bridge, which crosses the Rongesundet strait and there is a short bridge over the Ulvsundet strait on the north side of the island.

The island has about 1000 residents (est. 2008) and it is notable for its aquaculture industry.  There is a scallops hatchery located at Rong.  The island is the site of two municipal schools:  Rong School (grades 1-7), serving southern Øygarden, and Øygarden School (grades 8-10), serving the whole municipality.

See also
List of islands of Norway

References

Islands of Vestland
Øygarden